The “Shoot on the Spot” Declaration (Finnish: Ammutaan paikalla -julistus) was a statement issued by Carl Gustaf Emil Mannerheim, military leader of the Whites, on 25 February 1918, in the early stages of the Finnish Civil War. The Declaration was adopted as a rule of engagement of the White troops. Among other things, it directed the troops about the treatment of prisoners, and gave commanders of units wide powers to carry out executions at their sole discretion.

Already at its inception, its legality was highly questionable, because a death sentence for treason was not legal unless a state of war was declared. The senate (the government of the Whites) did not want to do this, because the only applicable law would have been the hated Czarist Russian martial law, which would also transfer powers to the army. They preferred to consider the Reds as "armed civilians". The army favored a declaration of war, in order to treat the prisoners as civilians, wherein execution for treason would become legal. A compromise was reached: the motivation was that an extrajudicial execution of a "saboteur caught red-handed" or "quarter at discretion" was a justifiable homicide committed in defense of life or property. In practice, battlefield commanders decided which Red prisoners would be released, detained or considered dangerous and summarily executed. For example, known "murderers" or "arsonists" were shot at the sole discretion of the commander. Due to this policy, it can be difficult to distinguish whether deaths "in battle" actually occurred in combat or as summary executions after the fact.

The mass execution known as "lottery of Huruslahti", an alleged decimation, was the defining moment. After this event, summary executions became common. Military tribunals were initially established, but generally interrogators could freely decide on the fate of the prisoners. On 25 February 1918, Mannerheim promulgated a decree to dismiss these tribunals. However, this had little effect because the battlefield commanders exercised their discretion largely independently far into the spring. Summary executions continued throughout 1918 even after the conclusion of the war, particularly in prison camps.

As Russian troops fought on the Red side, the Whites assumed that any Russians captured would be hostile and stoked ethnic hatred. Thus, any sort of Russians captured along with the Reds, civilian or military, were typically summarily executed. This included for example 200 Russian civilians in the aftermath of the Battle of Viipuri and even one White officer of Polish origin in the Battle of Tampere.

Regardless of its legality, the legality and possible guilt became a moot point after amnesty laws were passed after the war.

References

External links 

 Shoot on the Spot Declaration 

Finnish Civil War
February 1918 events
1918 documents